Uzbekistan joined the Commonwealth of Independent States in December 1991. However, it is opposed to reintegration and withdrew from the CIS collective security arrangement in 1999. Since that time, Uzbekistan has participated in the CIS peacekeeping force in Tajikistan and in United Nations-organized groups to help resolve the Tajik and Afghan conflicts, both of which it sees as posing threats to its own stability. Uzbekistan is an active supporter of U.S. efforts against worldwide terrorism and joined the coalitions which have dealt with both Afghanistan and Iraq (although, in 2005, relations with the U.S. were strained after the May 2005 unrest and Uzbekistan demanded that the U.S. leave Karshi-Khanabad). It is a member of the United Nations, the Euro-Atlantic Partnership Council, Partnership for Peace, and the Organization for Security and Cooperation in Europe (OSCE). It belongs to the Organisation of Islamic Cooperation (OIC) and the Economic Cooperation Organization, which comprises 7 Central Asian countries: Pakistan, Uzbekistan, Kazakhstan, Turkmenistan, Afghanistan, Kyrgyzstan and Tajikistan. It is a founding member of and remains involved in the Central Asian Union, formed with Kazakhstan and Kyrgyzstan, joined in March 1998 by Tajikistan.

In 1999, Uzbekistan joined the GUAM alliance (Georgia, Ukraine, Azerbaijan and Moldova), which was formed in 1997 (temporarily making it GUUAM until Uzbekistan withdrew in 2005). Uzbekistan is also a member of the Shanghai Cooperation Organisation (SCO) and hosts the SCO's Regional Anti-Terrorist Structure (RATS) in Tashkent. Uzbekistan also joined the new Central Asian Cooperation Organization (CACO) in 2002. The CACO consists of Uzbekistan, Tajikistan, Kazakhstan, and Kyrgyzstan. It is a founding member of and remains involved in the Central Asian Union, formed with Kazakhstan and Kyrgyzstan, joined in March 1998 by Tajikistan.

Turunen visit to Uzbekistan
Antti Turunen, the head of the Finnish Foreign Ministry's Eastern European and Central Asian department, led a European Union fact-finding mission to Tashkent, Uzbekistan on August 29, 2006. The Uzbek deputy foreign minister indicated that the Uzbek government was interested in talks with the EU during a visit to Helsinki, Finland in June 2006, just before Finland assumed the EU presidency. Radio Free Europe journalists spoke to Turunen on September 1. Turunen said the visit was inconclusive, but promising enough for the EU to "analyze" to see if the sanctions imposed on Uzbekistan could be lifted. Turunen's visit to Uzbekistan was the first EU visit since October, when sanctions were imposed after the Uzbek government refused to allow an international investigation into the Andijan massacre.

The diplomatic sanctions consisted of a ban on political contacts, aid cuts, and visa bans on officials held responsible for the events in Andijan and their cover-up. Turunen said, "There are many, many open cases on human rights, and we have to now carefully look into what has really been done and what recommendations of [the] international community have been implemented. They indicated [then] that there would be possibilities to again resume ministerial level dialogue, that they might be willing to again discuss all aspects of EU-Uzbek relations, including the events in Andijan. That will be part of the assessment of the sanctions regime and on the basis of that assessment a decision on the fate of the sanctions will be made by mid-November."

Turunen said that the visit went "smoothly" and that Uzbek Foreign Minister Vladimir Norov offered a "warm reception." The EU delegation met with officials from the Justice Ministry, the Attorney General's office, and Uzbek parliament members in a "rather good" atmosphere. He stressed that "the real issue" for the EU is the Uzbek government's response to the Andijan massacre and human rights abuses. "Well, it seems that at the moment the issue with the international inquiry is not on the agenda as such. They are to a certain extent open to discuss on expert level the events that took place in Andijan and we have to now see what this amounts to, what concrete steps towards that direction could be taken. The other issue is they are now willing to engage on human rights, to establish some kind of human rights dialogue or regular meetings on human rights issues which, in itself, is a positive signal."

Although he was unsure what prompted the invitation to EU officials, he said Uzbekistan is trying to overcome its isolation. He said Russia-Uzbek relations and possible EU development of Uzbek energy reserves were not "directly" discussed but that "one might assume in the longer run they look forward to EU investment in this area." If the sanctions are lifted, a "Cooperation Council" meeting with Foreign Minister Norov will take place in Brussels later this autumn.

Legal agreements with the Persian Gulf states
On 31 March 2009, Uzbekistan and the Sultanate of Oman agreed upon a legal framework that protects Omani investments in central Asia and guarantees trade from both nations is free from double taxation. The Sultanate's government has been pursuing economic diversification and privatisation policies for nearly a decade, having signed similar agreement with thirty of its other trading partners.

Diplomatic relations

Relations by country

See also
 List of diplomatic missions in Uzbekistan
 List of diplomatic missions of Uzbekistan
 Politics of Uzbekistan

References

External links
 Ministry of Foreign Affairs of Uzbekistan
Uzbekistan To Boost Cooperation With Malaysia
EU Delegation Visits Uzbekistan
Turkmenistan closes border with Uzbekistan